El Capitán Trueno (lit. "Captain Thunder") is the hero of a series of Spanish comic books, created in 1956 by the writer Víctor Mora and illustrated mainly by Miguel Ambrosio Zaragoza (Ambrós). The comics were published continuously between 1956 and 1968, with Trueno eventually becoming the most popular Spanish hero comic of all time: at its height it sold more than 170,000 copies every week. The series was inspired by Hal Foster's Prince Valiant.

Publication history
The comic was first published in 1956. Portions of the comic books have also been published in several Latin American countries, Italy (as "Capitan Tuono"), Greece (having its own title "ΤΡΟΥΕΝΟ", by Nikolaos Deligiorgis editions), Portugal and France. The series suffered some limited censorship during the dictatorship.  Censors were concerned, for example, that Capitán Trueno and Sigrid were traveling around the world unburdened by matrimonial ties (vínculos matrimoniales).

Characters and story
El Capitán Trueno is a 12th-century knight-errant, assisted by his faithful companions the cunning adolescent Crispín and the huge gourmandiser Goliath. His eternal dame is Sigrid of Thule, an energetic Viking princess who takes part in many of the adventures of the trio. In successive books, Capitán Trueno and his friends travel the whole world enforcing justice and freedom against bullies and tyrants, never using more violence than necessary.

In other media

Film
The character appears in the 2011 film Capitán Trueno y el Santo Grial (aka Captain Thunder and The Holy Grail), directed by Antonio Hernández, with actor Sergio Peris-Mencheta in the lead role.

Video game
A video game was released by Dinamic Software for the ZX Spectrum, Amstrad CPC and MSX.

Popular culture
El Capitán Trueno has been the subject of several popular songs; by Asfalto, in their eponymous 1978 debut album, and by Spanish pop veteran Miguel Bosé in his song "El Hijo del Capitan Trueno" (Captain Thunder's Son) from his 2001 album Sereno.

References

External links
El Capitán Trueno on-line 

Comics characters introduced in 1956
Fictional knights
Fictional Spanish people
Spanish comics characters
Spanish comics titles
1956 comics debuts
Comics set in the 12th century
Comics set in the Middle Ages
Comics adapted into video games
Superheroes